is a Japanese long-distance runner. She won a silver medal in the 10,000 m at the 2017 Asian Championships and placed seventh at the 2018 Asian Games.

References

Japanese female long-distance runners
1996 births
Living people
Athletes (track and field) at the 2018 Asian Games
Asian Games competitors for Japan